The 2013 Challenger Ciudad de Guayaquil was a professional clay-court tennis tournament. It was the ninth edition of the tournament, which was part of the 2013 ATP Challenger Tour. It took place in Guayaquil, Ecuador between 11 and 17 November 2013.

Singles main-draw entrants

Seeds

 1 Rankings are as of November 4, 2013.

Other entrants
The following players received wildcards into the singles main draw:
  Gonzalo Escobar
  Giovanni Lapentti
  Roberto Quiroz
  Jorman Reyes

The following players received entry from the qualifying draw:
  Martín Cuevas
  Guillermo Durán
  Nicolás Kicker
  Wesley Koolhof

Champions

Singles

 Leonardo Mayer def.  Pedro Sousa 6–4, 7–5

Doubles

 Stephan Fransen /  Wesley Koolhof def.  Roman Borvanov /  Alexander Satschko 1–6, 6–2, [10–5]

External links
Official Website

Challenger Ciudad de Guayaquil
Challenger Ciudad de Guayaquil